Anglada is a Catalan surname. Notable people with it include:

Héctor Anglada (1976–2002), Argentine actor
Hermenegildo Anglada Camarasa (1871–1959), Catalan painter
Josep Anglada (born 1959), Catalan politician
Lola Anglada (1893–1984), Catalan writer
Maria Àngels Anglada (1930–1999), Catalan poet and novelist

Catalan-language surnames